Douglas Creek is a creek in Douglas County, Washington. It rises in Douglas County, flows through Moses Coulee then empties to Wanapum Lake on the Columbia River. The course of the creek through Moses Coulee displays an "outdoor geologic laboratory" exhibiting basalt formations and relics of the Missoula floods of the last ice age. The creek's flow reaches the Columbia River "during storm water runoff events", otherwise being absorbed into the aquifer.

References

External links

Rivers of Douglas County, Washington